Ryan Timothy Anderson (born 1981) is an American conservative political philosopher who is best known for his opposition to same-sex marriage. He is currently president of the Ethics and Public Policy Center. He was previously the William E. Simon Senior Research Fellow at The Heritage Foundation and the founder and editor-in-chief of Public Discourse, the Witherspoon Institute's online journal.

Early life and education
Anderson was born in Baltimore. He grew up with three older brothers and one younger brother. Anderson received his bachelor of arts degree from Princeton University and his doctorate in political philosophy from the University of Notre Dame.

Published works 
Anderson's 2014 dissertation is titled Neither Liberal Nor Libertarian: A Natural Law Approach to Social Justice and Economic Rights, advised by Professor Michael Zuckert.

Anderson co-wrote the 2012 book What Is Marriage? Man and Woman: A Defense with Sherif Girgis and mentor Robert P. George. In it, they make the argument that the purpose of marriage is procreation and thus same-sex marriages should not be possible. Justice Samuel Alito referenced the book in his dissenting opinion in United States v. Windsor. In 2017, Anderson co-authored Debating Religious Liberty and Discrimination with Girgis and John Corvino. The book received positive reviews for its constructive, back-and-forth discussion on religious freedom and anti-discrimination law.

In 2018, Anderson released his book When Harry Became Sally: Responding to the Transgender Moment. The book, critical of what it calls "transgenderism" and heavily influenced by the works of Paul R. McHugh, came under scrutiny after it topped the Amazon bestsellers list in the Gay & Lesbian Civil Rights History category. On February 21 2021, the book was removed from Amazon. On March 11 2021, Amazon explained its decision in a letter addressed to Republican Senators Marco Rubio, Mike Lee, Mike Braun, and Josh Hawley. Anderson denies that his book describes transgender persons as "mentally ill." 

Anderson opposes the Equality Act.

Personal life 
Anderson is Catholic.

References

External link

1981 births
Date of birth missing (living people)
Living people
Writers from Baltimore
Princeton University alumni
Notre Dame College of Arts and Letters alumni
The Heritage Foundation
Witherspoon Institute
21st-century American male writers
21st-century American philosophers
American political philosophers
Philosophers from Maryland
American anti-same-sex-marriage activists
Ethics and Public Policy Center